Montaguto is a town and comune in the province of Avellino, Campania, southern Italy.

Located astride the Apennines between Irpinia historical district and Daunian Mountains, the town is part of the Roman Catholic Diocese of Ariano Irpino-Lacedonia. Its territory borders the municipalities of Greci, Orsara di Puglia, Panni and Savignano Irpino.

References

External links

Cities and towns in Campania
Hilltowns in Campania